Gnorismoneura brunneochroa is a moth of the family Tortricidae. It is found in Vietnam.

The wingspan is 16 mm. The ground colour of the forewings is cream with fine, dense brownish strigulation (fine streaks). There are two cream spots subapically. The markings are brown. The hindwings are cream brown with brown venation.

Etymology
The name refers to colouration of the forewing and is derived from Latin brunnea (meaning brown) and Greek chroa (meaning colour).

References

Moths described in 2008
Archipini
Moths of Asia
Taxa named by Józef Razowski